Paradise is a historic house at 158 Winchester Street in Warrenton, Virginia.  The oldest portion of this two story timber-frame house was built c. 1758, and is believed to be the oldest building in Warrenton.  The central block of the house is three bays, with a side passage plan.  It is flanked on either side by two-story wood frame wings.  The house exterior was extensively redecorated in 1870, adding a full-width porch and substantial Italianate and Folk Victorian woodwork.

The house was listed on the National Register of Historic Places in 2014; it is a contributing element of the Warrenton Historic District, listed in 1983.

See also
National Register of Historic Places listings in Fauquier County, Virginia

References

Houses on the National Register of Historic Places in Virginia
Houses completed in 1758
Houses in Fauquier County, Virginia
National Register of Historic Places in Fauquier County, Virginia
Individually listed contributing properties to historic districts on the National Register in Virginia